Antonio Helú Atta (1900–1972) was a Mexican screenwriter and film director.

According to Darrell B. Lockhart, Helú Atta was supposedly the first writer to have created a recurring Mexican detective figure in literature, namely Máximo Roldán. The originality of this character was that he did not belong to a law enforcement agency, but was himself a minor criminal ("Roldán" would be the anagram of "ládron", "thief" in Spanish).

A common theme in Helú Atta's work was the lack of faith of the protagonist in the justice system.

Referring to Helú Atta, the poet Xavier Villaurrutia stated "For the readers of police novels exists a small oasis of police stories by Antonio Helú". According to the writer Carlos Monsiváis, Helú Atta was "an author that truly believed in detective literature and dedicated most of his life to it".

Antonio Helú Atta also translated in Spanish works by Mark Twain and Nathaniel Hawthorne. He was the founder of the magazine Selecciones policiacas y de misterio, the Spanish version of the magazine Ellery Queen's Mystery Magazine.

Selected filmography

Director
 The Obligation to Assassinate (1937)
 The Pretty Indian Girl (1938)
 The Hypnotist (1940)
 When the Ground Trembled (1942)

Screenwriter
 Arm in Arm Down the Street (1956)

Novels 
 Pepe Vargas al teléfono, 1925. 29 pages.
 El centro de gravedad, 1925.
 Los predestinados, 1925.

Plays 
 (co-writer) El crimen del insurgentes: comedia policiaca en tres actos, 1935.

References

Bibliography 
 .

External links 
 

1900 births
1972 deaths
Mexican film directors
People from San Luis Potosí
20th-century Mexican screenwriters
20th-century Mexican male writers